666 (six hundred [and] sixty-six) is the natural number following 665 and preceding 667.

In Christianity, 666 is called the "number of the beast" in (most manuscripts of) chapter 13 of the Book of Revelation of the New Testament.

In mathematics
666 is the sum of the first 36 natural numbers (i.e. ); thus, it is a triangular number. Because 36 is also triangular, 666 is a doubly triangular number.

In decimal, 666 is a repdigit (and therefore a palindromic number) and a Smith number.

Also, 666 is the sum of the squares of the first seven primes: .

The Roman numeral for 666, DCLXVI, has exactly one occurrence of all symbols whose value is less than 1000 in decreasing order (D = 500, C = 100, L = 50, X = 10, V = 5, I = 1).

In religion

Number of the beast 

In the Textus Receptus manuscripts of the New Testament, the Book of Revelation cryptically asserts 666 to be "the man's number" or "the number of a man" (depending on how the text is translated) associated with the Beast, an antagonistic creature that appears briefly about two-thirds into the apocalyptic vision. Some manuscripts of the original Koine Greek use the symbols χξϛ chi xi stigma (or χξϝ with a digamma), while other manuscripts spell out the number in words.

In modern popular culture, 666 has become one of the most widely recognized symbols for the Antichrist or, alternatively, the devil. Earnest references to the number occur both among apocalypticist Christian groups and in explicitly anti-Christian subcultures.
References in contemporary Western art or literature are, more likely than not, intentional references to the Beast symbolism. Such popular references are therefore too numerous to list.

It is common to see the symbolic role of the integer 666 transferred to the numerical digit sequence 6-6-6. Some people take the Satanic associations of 666 so seriously that they actively avoid things related to 666 or the digits 6-6-6. This is known as hexakosioihexekontahexaphobia.

The Number of the Beast is cited as 616 in some early biblical manuscripts, the earliest known instance being in Papyrus 115.

Other occurrences 
 In the Bible, 666 is the number of talents of gold Solomon collected each year (see  and ).
 In the Bible, 666 is the number of Adonikam's descendants who return to Jerusalem and Judah from the Babylonian exile (see ).
 Using gematria, Neron Caesar transliterated from Greek into Hebrew short-form spelling, נרון קסר, produces the number 666. The Latin spelling of "Nero Caesar" transliterated into Ktiv haser Hebrew, נרו קסר, produces the number 616. Thus, in the Bible, 666 may have been a coded reference to Nero, who was the Roman emperor from 55 to 68 AD. Though historic protestants such as Andreas Helwig in 1612 proposed the application of the Isopsephy principle to the papal name Vicarius Filii Dei.

In other fields 

 Is the magic sum, or sum of the magic constants of a six by six magic square, any row or column of which adds up to 111.
 Is the sum of all the numbers on a roulette wheel (0 through 36).
 Was a winning lottery number in the 1980 Pennsylvania Lottery scandal, in which equipment was tampered to favor a 4 or 6 as each of the three individual random digits.
 Was the original name of the Macintosh SevenDust computer virus that was discovered in 1998. It is also the name of an extension that SevenDust can add to an uninfected Macintosh.
 The number is a frequent visual element of Aryan Brotherhood tattoos.
 Aleister Crowley adopted the title "the Beast 666". As such, 666 is also associated with him, his work, and his religious philosophy of Thelema.
 Molar mass of the high-temperature superconductor YBa2Cu3O7.
 In Chinese numerology, the number is considered to be lucky and is often displayed in shop windows and neon signs. In China, 666 can mean "everything goes smoothly" (the number six has the same pronunciation as the character 溜, which means "smooth".
 Is commonly used by ISPs to blackhole traffic using BGP communities.
666 Fifth Avenue in New York City, which was bought for $1.8 billion in 2007, was the most expensive real estate deal in New York's history.
 US Police Radio Code 666 means "countrywide emergency".
 The Number of the Beast, the 1982 album by English heavy metal band Iron Maiden, references 666 in its title and the album's title song.

Humour
Mathematicians and others have created a meme with the square root of 666, that is 25.8069. The saying goes, "If 666 is evil, then is 25.8069 the root of all evil?"

See also

 Numerology

References

External links 
 
 
 
 disastercountdown
 CNN(U.S.A):Pastor with 666 tattoo

Integers
Superstitions about numbers